418th may refer to:

418th Bombardment Group, inactive United States Air Force unit
418th Flight Test Squadron (418 FLTS), part of the 412th Test Wing based at Edwards Air Force Base, California
418th Tactical Fighter Training Squadron, inactive United States Air Force unit

See also
418 (number)
418, the year 418 (CDXVIII) of the Julian calendar
418 BC